Suzanne Bernard (1892 – 10 March 1912) was a pioneer French aviator. She was killed in a plane crash at the age of 19.

Bernard was killed at Étampes in an accident during her test for her pilot licence. The aircraft she was flying, a Caudron biplane, was caught in a wind and capsized, falling to the ground. Bernard was crushed beneath it. The previous year, another French woman, Deniz Moore, aged 35, had also died while flying. The deaths caused a great deal of mourning and reflection in aviation circles, and there was criticism of parents who permitted their daughters to engage in such dangerous activity.

References

1892 births
1912 deaths
Aviators killed in aviation accidents or incidents in France
French women aviators
People from Troyes
Victims of aviation accidents or incidents in 1912
20th-century French women